Snake cactus is a common name which may refer to the following species of cactus:

Acanthocereus tetragonus
Bergerocactus emoryi (the golden cereus)
Cylindropuntia spinosior

Nyctocereus serpentinus
 Species in the genus Selenicereus